A latecomer to the passenger facilities on the Helston branch, Truthall Halt was opened on 3 July 1905, at a location about  north of Helston. It was located just above the  contour and served the villages of Trannack and Gwavas, and also Truthall Manor. Truthall Halt was the first stop on the line from Helston and was a short platform with an iconic "Pagoda" style shelter.

Description
Truthall Halt was constructed adjacent to a road overbridge and had pedestrian access down a short flight of shallow steps from the road; there was no vehicular access. It had a single platform 84 feet long on the down side of the line, though it was shortened later to about 50 feet. The platform had stone edging and a cinder surface and infill held back by wooden slats retained by wooden posts and lengths of Barlow Rail, disposed of by the West Cornwall Railway and Great Western Railway.Great Western Railway

History
Truthall Halt was opened by the Great Western Railway in July 1905 after the line had been opened for a number of years.

Truthall Halt opened as such but changed its name to Truthall Platform in July 1906 and closed with this name on 5 November 1962. The station has held three different names – Truthall Platform, Truthall Halt and Truthall Bridge Halt – although the last one was only referred to in ticketing.

In 2016–17 the platform was rebuilt and re-opened in March 2017. On 9 February 2019, Truthall Halt and the Helston Railway won the Heritage Railway Association Annual Award for Small Groups for the work in restoring Truthall.

Restoration

The platform has been rebuilt by the Helston Railway as their third station along the line. The halt has been restored in its original two coach length with as many original features as possible  including a replica of the GWR Pagoda shelter has been built new from photos and original drawings of the shelter. 

The station was formally opened on the 5th April 2018 by HRH the Duke of Gloucester.

The restored station won the Cornish Buildings Group award in 2019 for its "considerable research and constructional ingenuity".

References

Disused railway stations in Cornwall
Former Great Western Railway stations
Railway stations in Great Britain opened in 1905
Railway stations in Great Britain closed in 1962
Railway stations in Great Britain opened in 2017